Rugby union at the 1900 Summer Olympics was played in Paris. Rugby union matches at the 1900 Summer Olympics were held on 14 October and 28 October. Forty-seven athletes competed, most from three nations and including a Haitian and a French-born American.

Summary 
France, represented by Union des Sociétés Françaises,  Germany, represented mainly by the FC 1880 Frankfurt, and Great Britain, represented by the Moseley Wanderers, all participated in the inaugural rugby event at the Olympics. Only two games were contested, France played both Germany and Great Britain, the French winning both matches.

This saw the gold go to France, and both Germany and Great Britain are credited with silver, with no bronze awarded. For medal purposes, the IOC regards the side from France as a "Mixed Team", as Constantin Henriquez was from Haiti. Further, André Roosevelt, an American born in France, was also on the French team.

Results

Match 1 

In the first half, France scored a try by Émile Sarrade and a conversion.  Germany scored tries by Heinrich Reitz and August Schmierer, with two conversions as well as a drop goal. Under the custom scoring rules of the Olympic tournament (3 points for tries or penalties, 2 points for conversions, 4 points for drop goals), this gave Germany a lead of 14–5.

The second half was vastly different, as Serrade scored two more tries while André Roosevelt also scored two and Frantz Reichel and A. Albert added one each.  Two more conversions were made, bringing France's score to a total of 27.  Germany, on the other hand, scored only one try, by one of the Ludwigs. France thus won the match 27–17.

Match 2 

The British team failed to score in the first half, while France continued the scoring barrage they had experienced in the second half of the Germany match. Sarrade scored two tries, bringing his tournament total to five. Joseph Olivier, Jean Collas, and Jean-Guy Gauthier each added a try. No conversions were scored, though André Rischmann's two penalties brought France's first-half total to 21.

Britain actually outscored France in the second half, 8–6, but had little chance of catching up. Joseph Wallis scored a try while J. Henry Birtles made a conversion and a penalty for Britain. Reichel scored his second try of the tournament, and Léon Binoche added a try to bring France's victory to a 27–8 margin.

A Reuters report of the match noted that the British squad's loss may have been in part to fatigue, as the players arrived in Paris only on the morning of the match. A crowd of 10,000 fans witnessed the match.

Medal table

Rosters

France (Mixed Team)

 Wladimir Aïtoff
 A. Albert
 Léon Binoche
 Jean Collas
 Jean-Guy Gauthier
 Auguste Giroux
 Charles Gondouin
 Constantin Henriquez (HAI)
 Jean Hervé
 Victor Larchandet
 Hubert Lefèbvre
 Joseph Olivier
 Alexandre Pharamond
 Frantz Reichel
 André Rischmann
 André Roosevelt (USA)
 Emile Sarrade

Germany

 Albert Amrhein
 Hugo Betting
 Jacob Herrmann
 Willy Hofmeister
 Hermann Kreuzer
 Arnold Landvoigt
 Hans Latscha
 Erich Ludwig
 Richard Ludwig
 Fritz Müller
 Eduard Poppe
 Heinrich Reitz
 August Schmierer
 Adolf Stockhausen
 Georg Wenderoth

Great Britain

 Frank Bayliss
 Henry Birtles
 James Cantion
 Arthur Darby
 Clement Deykin
 L. Hood
 M. L. Logan
 Herbert Loveitt
 Herbert Nicol
 V. Smith
 M. W. Talbot
 Joseph Wallis
 Claude Whittindale
 Raymond Whittindale
 Francis Wilson

Notes

References
 International Olympic Committee medal winners database
 De Wael, Herman. Herman's Full Olympians: "Rugby 1900". Accessed 2 March 2006.

External links

 Rugby at the Olympics
 

Rugby union
1900
Rugby union in Paris
International rugby union competitions hosted by France
1900 rugby union tournaments for national teams
1899–1900 in French rugby union
Men's events at the 1900 Summer Olympics